Dustin "Dusty" Davis (born June 27, 1992) is an American professional stock car racing driver. He last competed part-time in the NASCAR Camping World Truck Series, driving the No. 1 for Rick Ware Racing.

Motorsports career results

NASCAR
(key) (Bold – Pole position awarded by qualifying time. Italics – Pole position earned by points standings or practice time. * – Most laps led.)

Nationwide Series

 Season still in progress 
 Ineligible for series points

Camping World Truck Series

K&N Pro Series West

References

External links
 

1992 births
NASCAR drivers
Living people
Sportspeople from Las Vegas
Racing drivers from Nevada